Bonjour is a French word meaning (literally translated) "good day", and is commonly used as a greeting.

Bonjour may also refer to:

People
 Laurence BonJour (born 1943), epistemologist and professor of philosophy at the University of Washington
 Martín Bonjour  (born 1985), Argentine professional footballer
 Abel Bonjour, the Parisian cellist that the Bonjour Stradivarius was named after

Other
 Bonjour (software), an Apple computer program which implements Zeroconf, a service discovery protocol
 Bonjour Holdings, a Hong Kong-based retail company
 Bonjour Stradivarius, a cello named after Abel Bonjour
 Bonjour, a Weebl's cartoon about a French person
 Bonjour (album), an album by French-Algerian singer Rachid Taha
 Bonne Nuit, a 1999 made for TV horror movie starring Lucie Arnaz
 Bonjour, a character of one half of identical twin duo Bonjour and Au Revoir in Let's Go Luna!